The 26th Central American Championships in Athletics were held at the Estadio de Atletismo del Instituto Nicaragüense de Deportes in Managua, Nicaragua, between June 26–28, 2015.

A total of 44 events were contested, 22 by men and 22 by women.  In total, 7 championships records were set.  The new men's 400m mark (45.33 by Nery Brenes) was established in the heat.  El Salvador won the overall team trophy.

Medal summary
Complete results were published.

Men

Women

Medal table (unofficial)

Team trophies
El Salvador won the overall team trophy.

Total

Male

Female

Participation
According to an unofficial count, 192 (+ 8 guest) athletes from 7 (+ 1 guest) countries participated.

References

 
Central American Championships
Central American Championships in Athletics
Central American Championships in Athletics
International athletics competitions hosted by Nicaragua